Carolina Christian College (CCC) is a special purpose, undergraduate institution. CCC educates persons for Christian ministries through a program of Biblical and theological studies, general education in the arts and sciences, and professional studies. Emphasis is placed upon cultural awareness and urban ministry that will prepare workers to establish and serve the church in the United States and around the world.

Programs 
CCC offers certificate, undergraduate, and graduate level ministry programs. The degree programs offered at CCC are:

 Certificate in Biblical Stuides
Bachelor of Arts in Ministry (A.C.E./A.S.A.P.)
 Master’s of Religious Education (A.M.P) 
Doctor of Divinity

Several undergraduate minors are offered in addition to the Bachelor of Arts in Ministry. They include:

 Leadership
 Christian Counseling
 Biblical Studies
 Homiletics
 Nonprofit Leadership

References 

1945 establishments in North Carolina
Educational institutions established in 1945
Seminaries and theological colleges in North Carolina
Universities and colleges in Winston-Salem, North Carolina
Association of Christian College Athletics member schools